The F Tamandaré (F200) is a  general purpose frigate under construction for the Brazilian Navy.

History
Tamandaré is part of the so-called "Construction of the Naval Power Nucleus" plan conceived in 2017 by the Brazilian government, with the main purpose of replacing the  frigates in operation since 1975 and the Type 22s acquired second-hand from the UK in the 1990s.

The final configuration of armaments and sensors was announced in 10 June 2021. The boat is under construction by the Águas Azuis consortium composed by ThyssenKrupp Marine Systems, Embraer Defense & Security and the Ministry of Defence, at the Brazilian city of Itajaí since  4 September 2022

References

External links 

 Águas Azuis consortium website 
 TKMS Brazil website 
 Tamandaré project website

Tamandaré-class frigates
Ships built in Brazil